The 1938 Rutgers Queensmen football team represented Rutgers University in the 1938 college football season. In February 1938, Rutgers announced Tasker's resignation as Rutgers' football coach and his replacement by Harvey Harman. In their first season under coach Harman, the Queensmen compiled a 7–1 record, won the Middle Three Conference championship, and outscored their opponents 118 to 57. Rutgers only loss was to NYU by a 25-6 score.  On November 5, 1938, Rutgers played its first game at the new Rutgers Stadium, built at a cost of $1 million.  Playing in front of a crowd of 22,500, Rutgers won the game, 20-18, against Princeton, marking the first time Rutgers had defeated a Princeton team since the two schools played the first college football game in 1869. In the final game of the 1938 season, Rutgers defeated Lafayette to win the Middle Three championship.

Schedule

References

Rutgers
Rutgers Scarlet Knights football seasons
Rutgers Queensmen football